Gervais Cordin (born 10 December 1998) is a French rugby union player who plays for Toulon in the Top 14 and the French national team. His position is fullback.

Honours

International 
 France (U20)
Six Nations Under 20s Championship: 2018

References

External links
 
 Toulon profile

1998 births
Living people
French rugby union players
FC Grenoble players
RC Toulonnais players
Sportspeople from Grenoble
Rugby union fullbacks